Opole Silesia or Opolian Silesia (also known as Opolszczyzna), is a loosely defined historical region of Poland, part of Upper Silesia. 

Throughout a large part of its history, the region had been ruled by the Duchy of Opole and other Silesian Duchies. Following the Silesian Wars the region found itself within Prussia. In accordance with the Oder–Neisse line, Poland recovered Opole Silesia in 1945.

See also
Opole cuisine

References 

Geography of Opole Voivodeship
Opolian Silesia
Opolian Silesia